Lavers is a surname. Notable people with the surname include:

Alan Lavers (1912–1995), British cricketer
Charles Lavers (1896–1979), British World War I flying ace
Paul Lavers (born 1950), British television presenter
Steve Lavers (born 1954), Australian former rugby league footballer 
Waldron Lavers (1911–1979), Canadian politician and judicial clerk